The Bahamas competed at the 1984 Summer Olympics in Los Angeles, United States.  The nation returned to the Olympic Games after participating in the American-led boycott of the 1980 Summer Olympics.

Athletics

Men
Track & road events

Field events

Women
Track & road events

Field events

Boxing

Men

Sailing

Men

Open

Swimming

Men

See also
Bahamas at the 1983 Pan American Games

References
Official Olympic Reports
sports-reference

Nations at the 1984 Summer Olympics
1984
Olympics